Odixia is a genus of Tasmanian flowering plants in the tribe Gnaphalieae within the family Asteraceae.

 Species
 Odixia achlaena (D.I.Morris) Orchard - Tasmania
 Odixia angusta (N.A.Wakef.) Orchard - Tasmania

References

Gnaphalieae
Asteraceae genera
Flora of Tasmania